Sutton House is a Grade II* listed Tudor manor house in Homerton High Street, in Hackney and is in London Borough of Hackney, London, England. It is owned by the National Trust.

History
Originally known as Bryck Place, Sutton House was built in 1535 by Sir Ralph Sadler, Principal Secretary of State to Henry VIII, and is the oldest residential building in Hackney. It is a rare example of a red brick building from the Tudor period. Here, in 1569, Sadler entertained the Scottish diplomats William Maitland of Lethington and Robert Pitcairn during the negotiations with Elizabeth I.

Sutton House became home to a succession of merchants, sea captains, Huguenot silk-weavers, Victorian schoolmistresses and Edwardian clergy. The frontage was modified in the Georgian period, but the core remains an essentially Tudor building. Oak panelled rooms, including a rare 'linen fold' room, Tudor windows and carved fireplaces survive intact, and an exhibition tells the history of the house and its former occupants.

At the turn of the 18th century, Hackney was renowned for its many schools, and Sutton House contained a boys' school, with headmaster Dr Burnet, which was attended in 1818 by the novelist Edward Bulwer-Lytton. The building next became Milford House girls' school.

The name is a mis-attribution to Thomas Sutton, founder of Charterhouse School, who was another notable Hackney resident, in the adjacent Tan House. This was demolished in 1806 to allow for the extension of Sutton Place, a terrace of 16 Georgian Houses (Grade II listed).

Sutton House was bought by the National Trust in the 1930s with the proceeds of a bequest. During World War II it was used as a centre for Fire Wardens, who kept watch from the roof. From the 1960s it was rented by the ASTMS Union, led by its charismatic general secretary Clive Jenkins. When the union left in the early 1980s, the house fell into disrepair.

The house is the oldest surviving domestic building in Hackney.  It is the second oldest in East London, Bromley Hall, a much modified house of the Tudor period, which survives next to the Blackwall Tunnel approach road, being slightly older; the latter is not open to the public.

Rescue
In the mid-1980s the building was squatted and used as a music venue and social centre, known as the Blue House (a decorated wall from this time is preserved within the current museum). After the squatters were evicted the building's condition continued to decline. The Sutton House Society, originally known as the Save Sutton House Campaign, which was formed in March 1987, then began a campaign to rescue the building and open it to the public. Renovations were completed in 1991. The building remains in use as a museum, as well as housing a café, an art gallery and a book and gift shop. There is an active schools education programme at the house, together with other community programmes. Sutton House was short-listed for the 2004 Gulbenkian Prize. It is registered for the conduct of marriages.

The restoration was completed in 1993 and the house fully opened in 1994. The weekend of 23 and 24 June 2007 represented the 20th anniversary of the campaign to save the house, and the 500th anniversary of the birth of its commissioner, Ralph Sadler.

Transport

The closest railway stations are Hackney Central station and Homerton station on the North London Line (part of the London Overground network). Many buses also stop in this area. The pedestrian route from Hackney Central passes St Augustine's Tower, a remnant of Hackney's Tudor Parish church.

References and notes

Further reading
Patrick Wright: A Journey Through Ruins (Radius, 1991)
Jennifer Jenkins and Patrick James: From Acorn to Oak Tree (Macmillan, 1994)
Victor Belcher, Richard Bond, Mike Gray and Andy Wittrick: Sutton House — a Tudor Courtier’s House in Hackney (English Heritage, 2004)

External links

 Sutton House information at the National Trust
 Sutton House Music Society
 Sutton House Society 
 Flickr pictures tagged Sutton House

Houses completed in 1535
History of the London Borough of Hackney
National Trust properties in London
Grade II* listed houses in London
Grade II* listed museum buildings
Houses in the London Borough of Hackney
Museums in the London Borough of Hackney
Historic house museums in London
1535 establishments in England
Hackney, London
Squats in the United Kingdom
Evicted squats